Odites venusta is a moth in the family Depressariidae and superfamily Gelechioidea. It was described by Sigeru Moriuti in 1977. It is found in Japan.

References

Moths described in 1977
Odites